The 1993 ECO summit was the second Economic Cooperation Organization summit, held between 6–7 May in Istanbul, Turkey. Afghanistan was welcomed as the 10th member state of the ECO during the summit.

Attending delegations
 President Burhanuddin Rabbani 
 Vice Prime Minister Resul Guliev 
 President Hashemi Rafsanjani  
 President Nursultan Nazarbaev 
 President Askar Akaev  
 Prime Minister Nawaz Sharif  
 Chairman Emomali Rahmanov 
 President Suleyman Demirel 
 President Saparmurad Niyazov 
 President Islam Karimov

References

External links

1990s in Istanbul
20th-century diplomatic conferences
1993 in international relations
1993 conferences
1993 in Turkey
May 1993 events in Asia
May 1993 events in Europe
Economic Cooperation Organization summits
Economy of Istanbul
Events in Istanbul